is a city located on the coast of the Sea of Japan in Shimane Prefecture, Japan. The city has a total area of 436.11 km2. On March 1, 2017, the city's population was estimated at 34,354, giving a population density of 79 persons per km2.  The city was founded on January 1, 1954. Ōda is home to the Iwami Ginzan Silver Mine, a World Heritage Site.

History
The area of present-day Ōda located in Izumo Province. The area was a strategic meeting point of three ancient transportation routes: the San'in, Izumo, and the Bingo. As a result, numerous market towns were developed in the area.

On October 1, 2005, the towns of Nima and Yunotsu (both from Nima District) were merged into Ōda. Therefore, Nima District was dissolved as a result of this merger.

Geography
Located in the central coastal portion of Shimane Prefecture, Ōda borders the Sea of Japan to the north and the Chūgoku Mountains to the south. Mount Sanbe, part of Daisen-Oki National Park, is a double volcano of the Hakusan Volcanic Zone, and is situated to the southeast of the city.

Neighboring municipalities
Shimane Prefecture
Izumo
Misato
Kawamoto
Iinan
Gōtsu

Climate
Ōda has a humid subtropical climate (Köppen climate classification Cfa) with very warm summers and cool winters. Precipitation is abundant throughout the year.

Demographics
Per Japanese census data, the population of Ōda in 2020 is 32,846 people. Ōda has been conducting censuses since 1920.

Economy
Ōda remains a center of agricultural production. The city is a center for dairy farms. Additionally, the city is known for its roof tile industry, produced since early times as Iwami gawara, or kawara Japanese roof tiles of Iwami.

Transportation
Ōda is serviced by two transportation networks. The first is JR West Sanin Main Line, connecting Ōdashi Station to Tottori through Yonago and Matsue to the east, and connecting along the coast to Hamada and Masuda to the west.

The secondary transportation network is the Intercity bus. The Ōdashi Station is the terminal, and the line runs from Hiroshima Station and Hiroshima Bus Center.

Local attractions

Iwami Ginzan Silver Mine
Ōda is home to the Iwami Ginzan Silver Mine, a World Heritage Site. Iwami Ginzan was the largest silver mine in Japanese history. Active for almost four hundred years, it operated from the discovery of silver in the area in 1526 until 1923. Iwami Ginzan was the most important source of silver to the Tokugawa Shogunate during the Edo period (1603 – 1868), and was directly controlled by the Tokugawa government. The mine is a popular tourist destination in Shimane, and can be reached by bus from Ōda Station on the JR West Sanin Main Line.

Nima Sand Museum
The Nima Sand Museum features a large hourglass mechanism that automatically rotates from December 31 to January 1. It is designated the largest hourglass in the world, but is not officially registered in Guinness World Records. This museum officially opened in March 1991.

Sand_p1  This museum features sand comprising six large and small pyramids made of crystal glass. The world's largest hourglass Sunagoyomi measures the duration of a year and is displayed in the center of the building.

 Address  975, Amagouchi, Nima-cho, Oda-City, Shimane-Prefecture
 Access  10 minutes walk from JR Nima Station
 Opening hours  9:00 a.m. - 5:00 p.m. (entry by 4:30 p.m.)
 Closed:The 1st Wednesday of every month, year-end and new year holidays
 URL  http://www.sandmuseum.jp/

Sister cities
 Daejeon (since November 14, 1987)
 Kasaoka, Okayama (since April 14, 1990)

References

External links

Ōda City official website 

Cities in Shimane Prefecture